John Daido Loori (June 14, 1931 – October 9, 2009) was a Zen Buddhist rōshi who served as the abbot of Zen Mountain Monastery and was the founder of the Mountains and Rivers Order and CEO of Dharma Communications. Daido Loori received shiho (dharma transmission) from Taizan Maezumi in 1986 and also received a Dendo Kyoshi certificate formally from the Soto school of Japan in 1994. In 1997, he received dharma transmission in the Harada-Yasutani and Inzan lineages of Rinzai Zen as well. In 1996 he gave dharma transmission to his student Bonnie Myotai Treace, in 1997 to Geoffrey Shugen Arnold, and in 2009 to Konrad Ryushin Marchaj. In addition to his role as a Zen Buddhist priest, Loori was an exhibited photographer and author of more than twenty books and was an avid naturalist.

In October 2009, he stepped down as abbot citing health issues. Days later, Zen Mountain Monastery announced that his death was imminent. On October 9, 2009, at 7:30 a.m. he died of lung cancer in Mount Tremper, New York.

Biography
John Daido Loori was born in Jersey City, New Jersey and raised Roman Catholic.  As a child Loori loved photographing things, once using his family's bathroom as a makeshift dark room. He served in the U.S. Navy from 1947 to 1952. Later, after studying at Rutgers, he worked as a chemist in the food industry  and led the American Civil Liberties Union in Orange and Sullivan Counties in New York. As an adult he distanced himself from Catholicism and explored a variety of other religions. Then, in 1971, he attended a workshop given by the photographer Minor White. Loori came to study photography under White until his death and also learned meditation from him. In 1972 Daido Loori began his formal Zen practice, studying in New York under Soen Nakagawa and then in California under Taizan Maezumi, Roshi.

In 1980 Loori purchased  in New York which today serves as the site for Zen Mountain Monastery. In 1983 he was made a Zen priest by Maezumi and in 1986 was given shiho (or, dharma transmission) by him. In 1997, he received dharma transmission in the Harada-Yasutani and Inzan lineages of Rinzai Zen as well. According to author Richard Hughes, this made Loori "one of three Western dharma-holders in both the Soto and Rinzai schools."
Loori was a professional nature photographer, having once exhibited his work at the American Museum of Natural History in Manhattan, New York. He has also held various other shows and workshops on photography, including positions at Naropa University starting in 1974 and the Synechia Arts Center located in Middletown, New York; his works have been published by Aperture and Time-Life. His book, Hearing with the Eye: Photographs from Point Lobos, features Loori's abstract nature photography interwoven with commentary on Teachings of the Insentient by Eihei Dogen.

Loori founded Dharma Communications as a way to communicate the dharma of the Mountains and Rivers Order. Dharma Communications publishes a Buddhist quarterly titled the Mountain Record, various audio-visual materials, and has also published several books by Daido Loori. According to Charles S. Prebish, Dharma Communications is "one of the most efficient and successful publishers of Buddhist materials on the continent, and a place where practitioners can learn how to cultivate both mindfulness and compassion in front of a computer."

Books
The Way of Mountains and Rivers
The Zen Art Box with Stephen Addiss
Hearing with the Eye: Teachings of the Insentient
The Zen of Creativity : Cultivating Your Artistic Life
The Eight Gates of Zen : A Program of Zen Training
Sitting with Koans : Essential Writings on the Zen Practice of Koan Study with Tom Kirshner. 
The True Dharma Eye : Zen Master Dogen's Three Hundred Koans with Kazuaki Tanahashi (Translator).
The Heart of Being: Moral and Ethical Teachings of Zen Buddhism
The Art of Just Sitting, Second Edition : Essential Writings on the Zen Practice of Shikantaza
Celebrating Everyday Life: Zen Home Liturgy
Making Love with Light, a book of nature photography. 
Riding the Ox Home : Stages on the Path of Enlightenment
The Still Point: A Beginner's Guide to Zen Meditation
Cave Of Tigers : Modern Zen Encounters
Invoking Reality: Moral and Ethical Teachings of Zen
Path of Enlightenment: Stages in a Spiritual Journey
Two Arrows Meeting in Mid-Air: The Zen Koan
Mountain Record of Zen Talks
Teachings of the Insentient: Zen and the Environment

Translated editions
Das Zen der Kreativitat (German ed.) – 2006 Theseus Verlag, Berlin 3-89620-287-1
Célébrer la Vie au Quotidien (French ed.): 2003 BDLYS Ed. 2-914395-20-5
La Recontre de la Réalité (French ed.) by BDLYS Ed. 2-914395-21-3
El Punto de Quietud (Spanish ed.): 2001 Mandala Ed. 84-95052-69-5
Hat ein Hund Buddha-Natur? (German ed.): 1996 Taschenbuch Verlag GmbH 9-783596-130191

Filmography
The Still Point: Introduction to Zen Meditation
Entering the Mountain Gate: Essentials of Zen
Oryoki: Formal Monastery Meal
The Heart of Being: Zen Buddhist Precepts
Mountain Light Video Library: A Collection of 27 Dharma Discourses
One Bright Pearl: Dharma Combat
Enlarging the Universe: Creative Expression
Fire Keeper: Student Mind
The Art of Seeing 
The Great Earth's Edict: Zen and Environmentalism

Recent photography exhibitions
"The Tao of Water", Jan. 18 - Mar. 22, 2008    Gallery at 910, Denver, CO 
"Jinzu", April 19 - June 6, 2007    Gallery at 910, Denver, CO
"Jinzu", Sept. 8 - Dec. 31, 2006   Buffalo Big Print, Buffalo, New York

Gallery

See also
Buddhism in the United States
List of Rinzai Buddhists
Timeline of Zen Buddhism in the United States

Notes

References

External links
Mountains and Rivers Order of Zen Buddhism
Author Spotlight on Loori at Random House, publisher of some of his books

Daido Roshi interview on PBS
Zen's Radical Conservative: John Daido Loori

1930 births
2009 deaths
American scholars of Buddhism
Rinzai Buddhists
Soto Zen Buddhists
White Plum Asanga
Zen Buddhism writers
American Zen Buddhists
American Buddhist monks
American former Christians
Former Roman Catholics
Deaths from lung cancer in New York (state)
20th-century Buddhist monks